Charles Reginald Ford (4 February 1880 – 19 May 1972) was a New Zealand explorer, land agent and architect. He was born in London, England on 4 February 1880.

See also
Gummer and Ford

References

1880 births
1972 deaths
New Zealand architects
New Zealand explorers
Architects from London